Sommerhausen is a municipality and market town in the district of Würzburg in Bavaria, Germany.

History
Sommerhausen has been an important municipality on the Main since the Middle Ages. It did not belong to the prince-bishop of Würzburg; The inhabitants acknowledged the Reformation, so that Sommerhausen is now a Protestant enclave in the predominantly Catholic Mainfranken. As part of the rule mediated by Bavaria, Speckfeld, the heirs of the Counts of Limpurg (Count Pückler and Rechtern), Sommerhausen belonged to the Frankish Reichskreis from 1500 onwards. In 1810, the district of Würzburg, with which it fell back to Bavaria in 1814, came to settle in the area. In the course of the administrative reforms in Bavaria, the municipal council of 1818 created the present municipality.

The place, embedded in the Valley of the Main among vineyards, has been the hanger for Frankish romanticism for decades. The medieval city wall has been preserved. All buildings in the town center in the narrow, winding streets look back on several hundred years of history. The town hall dates from the 16th century.

References

Würzburg (district)